Anita Garibaldi is a 2012 Italian television miniseries directed by Claudio Bonivento and starring Valeria Solarino in the title role.

It is  based on real life events of Anita Garibaldi, wife and comrade-in-arms of Italian revolutionary Giuseppe Garibaldi. It was shot between Portugal, Bulgaria and Italy, with a budget of about 6 million euros.

Plot

Cast 

 Valeria Solarino as Anita
 Giorgio Pasotti as Giuseppe Garibaldi
 Tosca D'Aquino as Ester	
 Nicoletta Romanoff as  Margareth Furrell 
  Fabio Galli as Luigi Rossetti 
  Nini Salerno  as Aurelio Saffi
  Thamisanqa Molepo as  Andrea Aguyar
  Massimiliano Franciosa as  Leggero
  Bruno Conti as  Domenico Cirillo
  Mauro Marino as  Ugo Bassi
  Lorenzo Roma as  Righetto
 Jonis Bashir as  Pedro
  Gianfelice Facchetti as  Luciano Manara
  Filippo Scarafia as  Goffredo Mameli
 Pietro Ghislandi  as   Gioacchino Bonnet 
  Francesca Antonelli as  Annetta
 Maria Pia Calzone as Enrichetta Pisacane 
  Rosa Pianeta as   Rosa Garibaldi 
  Francesco D’Avanzo as  Paolo Antonini 
  Alessandro Lombardo as  Giuseppe Mazzini 
 Edoardo Purgatori  as  Nino Bixio
  Francesca Cavallin as  Cristina Trivulzio Belgiojoso 
  Giorgio Gobbi as Ciceruacchio

References

External links

2010s Italian drama television series
Television shows set in Italy
2010s Italian television miniseries
Cultural depictions of Giuseppe Garibaldi